Captain Beyond is an American rock supergroup formed in Los Angeles in 1971. Consisting of former Deep Purple singer Rod Evans, former Johnny Winter drummer Bobby Caldwell, former Iron Butterfly guitarist Larry Reinhardt and former Iron Butterfly bassist Lee Dorman, the band had an eclectic style bridging elements of hard rock, progressive rock and jazz fusion with space rock. They released three albums between 1972 and 1977. 

The band was plagued since its inception with significant problems, including lawsuits involving Evans, Reinhardt and Dorman with their former bands, and a dispute over musical style with their record label, Capricorn Records. Although the band performed well together, relationships among the various band members were strained. In particular, singer Rod Evans left and rejoined the band several times beginning in 1971, and made his departure permanent in late 1973, after the release of the band's second album.

History

The original line-up for Captain Beyond included former Deep Purple singer Rod Evans, former Johnny Winter drummer Bobby Caldwell, former Iron Butterfly guitarist Larry "Rhino" Reinhardt and former Iron Butterfly bassist Lee Dorman alongside keyboardist Lewie Gold. Gold left due to personal reasons before the first album was recorded. The remaining line-up recorded the self-titled debut album, released in 1972 by Capricorn Records, a Macon, Georgia-based independent label primarily known for cultivating such Southern rock groups as The Allman Brothers Band and Wet Willie.

Following that album, Caldwell left the band to join Derringer and was replaced by Brian Glascock. Also joining the band around that time were keyboardist Reese Wynans and conguero Guille Garcia. The record company's chosen producer, Giorgio Gomelsky, did not like Glascock's drumming and requested a new drummer. Glascock was released and Marty Rodriguez was brought in on drums on the recommendation of Garcia. This six-man lineup recorded the group's second album, Sufficiently Breathless, with producer and Capricorn Records co-founder Phil Walden. Tension during the recording led to Evans quitting, and the band splitting consequently. The original lineup with Caldwell reformed later in 1973 for gigs in the US and Canada. However, Evans left the band permanently around Christmas of 1973 and the band broke up.

The band reformed in 1976 with Caldwell, Dorman, and Rhino, being joined first by Jason Cahoon and later with Willy Daffern as vocalist. They recorded the band's third album Dawn Explosion on Warner Bros., but broke up in 1978.

Caldwell and Rhino reformed Captain Beyond in 1998, with Jimi Interval on vocals, Dan Frye on keyboards, and Jeff Artabasy on bass. In 1999, Swedish record label Record Heaven released a tribute to Captain Beyond entitled Thousand Days of Yesterday. The album features fellow 1970s rockers Pentagram playing "Dancing Madly Backwards". In 2000 they released a four track EP entitled Night Train Calling. Shortly thereafter they were joined briefly by guitarist Steve Petrey.

Captain Beyond once again disbanded in 2003 when lead guitarist Larry Reinhardt developed cancer. Following treatment, Reinhardt continued to perform music until late 2011, when he again fell ill. He died on January 2, 2012. Bassist Lee Dorman died on December 21, 2012. Rod Evans has retired from performing, partly due to legal troubles with his original Deep Purple bandmates, and his current residence is still unknown. However, Caldwell mentioned in a 2015 interview that Evans was doing just fine and was working in the field of respiratory therapy.

Caldwell resurrected the band in 2013, with a lineup consisting of Don Bonzi, Jeff "Boday" Christensen, and Jamie Holka, bassist Allen Carmen, and guitarist/keyboardist/vocalist Simon Lind. In 2015 Carmen and Christensen departed the band and Artabasy returned as bassist. The reformed group began touring in 2015.

Personnel

Members

Current members
 Bobby Caldwell - drums, percussion (1971–1973, 1973, 1976–1978, 1998–2003, 2013–present)
 Jeff Artabasy - bass (1998–2003, 2015–present)
 Don Bonzi - guitar (2013–present)
 Jamie Holka - guitar (2013–present)
 Simon Lind - guitar, keyboards, vocals (2013–present)

Former members
 Lee Dorman - bass (1971–1973, 1973, 1976–1978)
 Rod Evans - vocals (1971–1973, 1973)
 Lewie Gold - keyboards (1971)
 Larry "Rhino" Reinhardt - guitar (1971–1973, 1973, 1976–1978, 1998–2003)
 Guille Garcia - percussion (1973)
 Brian Glascock - drums (1973)
 Reese Wynans - keyboards (1973)
 Marty Rodriguez - drums (1973)
 Jason Cahoon - vocals (1981)
 Willy Daffern - vocals (1976–1978)
 Dan Frye - keyboards (1998–2003)
 Jimi Interval - vocals (1998–2003)
 Steve Petrey - guitar (2000–2001)
 Allen Carmen - bass (2013–2015)
 Jeff "Boday" Christensen - guitar (2013–2015)

Lineups

Timeline

Discography

Studio albums

LPs
Captain Beyond (1972)
Sufficiently Breathless (1973)
Dawn Explosion (1977)
The Future is Now  (2019)

EP
Night Train Calling (2000)

Live releases
Far Beyond a Distant Sun – Live Arlington, Texas (1973)
Frozen Over Live (1973, Bootleg Version) 
Live In Texas - October 6, 1973 (Official Bootleg, 2013 Reissue) 
Live Anthology (Official Bootleg, 2013) 
Live In Montreux 1972: 04.30.72 (2016)
Live In Miami August 19, 1972 (2019)
Live In New York - July 30th, 1972 (2019)

Compilations
Lost & Found 1972-1973 (2017)

Covers and tribute releases
Thousand Days of Yesterdays (1999)
 In 1985 US Hi-NRG outfit The Flirts released a single entitled "Dancing Madly Backwards" (Germany #46, US Dance #47). Although musically and lyrically totally different, its chorus is lifted directly from "Dancing Madly Backwards (On a Sea of Air)" off Captain Beyonds first album.

References

External links

 

American space rock musical groups
Rock music supergroups
Musical groups established in 1972
Progressive rock musical groups from California
Psychedelic rock music groups from California